The Scavengers (1969) is a western war drama and exploitation film released in 1969, and re-released as The Grabbers in 1970. It was directed by Lee Frost and starred John Bliss. Uschi Digard also participated.

The film takes place in the period just after the American Civil War. Renegade Confederate soldiers take over a frontier town, but after they molest a young black woman, a group of ex-slaves arm themselves and counter-attack.

The film, like Love Camp 7, is considered among the more notorious of Frost's films.

References

External links 
 

1969 films
Films directed by Lee Frost
1960s war drama films
1960s action films
1969 drama films